Slimane Sissoko (born 20 March 1991) is a French professional footballer who last played as a striker for Nîmes. Sissoko is of Malian descent.

Club career
Sissoko is a youth product of Rennes, though he was never offered a spot in the club's first team. After making his debut in the French lower divisions, he joined Angers in 2015. He made his full professional debut a few weeks later,  in a 2–0 Ligue 1 victory against Montpellier, where he made the assist for Gilles Sunu on the second goal of the game.

References

External links
 
 
 Slimane Sissoko foot-national.com Profile

1991 births
Living people
Association football forwards
French footballers
French people of Malian descent
Ligue 1 players
Championnat National players
US Boulogne players
Luçon FC players
Angers SCO players
Nîmes Olympique players
Sainte-Geneviève Sports players
Footballers from Paris